The Tseycum First Nation is a First Nations government located on Vancouver Island.  In the 1850s they were signatories to the Douglas Treaties.

Chief and Councillors

Demographics
The Tseycum First Nation has 166 members.

Indian reserves
Indian reserves under the administration of the band are:
Bare Island Indian Reserve No. 9, comprising the whole of Mandarte Island at the head of Haro Strait, 10.50 ha.
Goldstream Indian Reserve No. 13, at the south end of Finlayson Arm and the mouth of the Goldstream River, 4.80 ha.
Pender Island Indian Reserve No. 8, on Hay Point on the west side of South Pender Island, 3.20 ha.
Saturna Island Indian Reserve No. 7, on the easterly point of Saturna Island at the south entrance of the Strait of Georgia, 145.70 ha.
Union Bay Indian Reserve No. 4, fronting on Patricia Bay, Saanich Inlet, 28.0 ha.

References

Coast Salish governments
Southern Vancouver Island